Christopher Maleki (born February 26, 1964) is an American soap opera actor and photographer. He is best known for portraying the role of Herbert "Spike" Lester on Passions.

Filmography
Supah Ninjas – X (2011) (TV)
Finding Hope Now – Mr. Delgado (2010) (Film)
Iron Man 2 – Reporter (uncredited) (2010) (Film)
I Love You, Man – Buddy #5 (uncredited) (2009) (Film)
Igor – Killiseum Fan #6 (voice) (uncredited) (2008) (Film)
Beverly Hills Chihuahua – Yikes (uncredited) (2008) (Film)
Offside: The Price of Dreams – Dr. Shafian (2006) (Film)
Passions – Herbert "Spike" Lester (10 March 2005 to 7 January 2008) (TV)
Tears of a Clown – Bob Grossman (2005)(Film)
McBride: It's Murder, Madam – Jorge (2005) (TV)
Mojave – Voice Over (2004) (Film)
Fossil – Josh Milland (2004) (Film)
Power Rangers: Wild Force – "The Soul of Humanity" – Worker #1 (as Chris Maleki) (2002) (TV)
Port Charles – Ben Shapour (2001) (TV)
Shock 'Em Dead - Dustin (1991) (Film)
Sea of Love – Detective (uncredited) (1989) (Film)
Less than Zero – Guy at Party (uncredited) (1987) (Film)
Can't Buy Me Love (film) - Frat Guy (uncredited) (1987) (Film)

External links

Christopher Maleki on Myspace

1964 births
American male soap opera actors
American photographers
Living people
Male actors from Glendale, California